This is the list of Belgian Budget ministers.

List of ministers

Federal ministers

2000–

Flemish ministers

2000–

Lists of government ministers of Belgium